The Australia First Movement was a fascist movement, founded in October 1941. It grew out of the Rationalist Association of New South Wales and the Victorian Socialist Party, and was led by former Rhodes scholar Percy Stephensen and Adela Pankhurst. Writers Xavier Herbert and Eleanor Dark were involved with the organisation, which was inspired by the activities of retired businessman, William John Miles, who had campaigned during the 1930s under the "Australia First" slogan.

Between 1936 and 1942, Miles published 16 volumes of a newsletter titled The Publicist, to which he contributed. He was a leading member of the Rationalist Association, and used The Publicist as his mouthpiece. Before 1939, it described itself as being "for national socialism" and "for Aryanism; against semitism". In January 1942, the ailing Miles transferred editorship of The Publicist to his co-author Stephensen, and had no involvement in the Australia First Movement, dying later that year.

The Australia First Movement has been characterised as anti-Semitic, anti-war and pro-isolationist, and advocated Australia's independence from the British Empire. It attracted the support of the Catholic weekly, The Advocate, as well as the Odinist Alexander Rud Mills. By 1938, those who were later associated with the Australia First Movement were advocating the establishment of a national socialist corporate state  and a political alliance with the Axis powers of Germany, Italy and Japan. A number of members came from a far-left background: Stephensen, Pankhurst and Walsh were former Communists.

In March 1942, four members of the Australia First Movement in Perth, and sixteen in Sydney, were arrested, based on the suspicion that they would provide help to Japanese invaders. Two were convicted of conspiring to assist the enemy, and others were interned for the duration of the war. Adela Pankhurst, of the famous suffragette family, had visited Japan in 1939 and was arrested and interned in 1942 for her advocacy of peace with Japan. In his official history of Australian involvement in the Second World War, Paul Hasluck criticised those internments as the "grossest infringement of individual liberty made during the war".

See also
 New Guard
 Centre Party
 Far-right politics in Australia

References

Further reading

Political history of Australia
Political movements in Australia
Australian nationalism
Fascist movements